COTS may refer to:

 Commercial off-the-shelf, products that are commercially available and can be bought "as is"
 Commercial Orbital Transportation Services, a NASA program for delivery to the International Space Station by private companies

 Crown-of-thorns starfish, a large, multiple-armed starfish

See also
 COT (disambiguation)